Sulaiman bin Sujak (born 25 March 1934 in Singapore) was the first non-British Chief of Air Force, Malaysia (November 1, 1967 – December 31, 1976)

Sulaiman studied in Bartley Secondary School and Victoria School in Singapore. He started training in the Malayan Air Training Corps (MATC) and in the UK from 1955 at the RAF College, Cranwell, graduating in 1958 as a Pilot Officer in the RAF, the Malaysian Air Force not having been created at that time.  In the 1960s he was a Flight Lieutenant on an RAF Squadron in Cyprus flying the Canberra light bomber when the Royal Malaysian Air Force was formed.  In September 1965 he joined the Royal Malaysian Air Force as a Squadron Leader, and shortly afterwards took command of the RMAF base at Alor Star as Group Captain.

On 1 November 1967, he was promoted to Air Commodore and became the first Chief of the Royal Malaysian Air Force. 

Sulaiman later became the Vice-Chairman of Malaysia Airlines.

Honours

Honour of Malaysia
  : 
 Member of the Order of the Defender of the Realm (AMN) (1967)
 Companion of the Order of the Defender of the Realm (JMN) (1969)
 Commander of the Order of Loyalty to the Crown of Malaysia (PSM) – Tan Sri (2008)
  : 
 Knight Commander of the Order of the Crown of Selangor (DPMS) – Dato’ (1970)

References

|-

1934 births
Living people
Royal Malaysian Air Force personnel
Air marshals
Victoria School, Singapore alumni
Commanders of the Order of Loyalty to the Crown of Malaysia
Knights Commander of the Order of the Crown of Selangor
Members of the Order of the Defender of the Realm
Companions of the Order of the Defender of the Realm